Lecithocera formosana is a moth in the family Lecithoceridae. It was described by Shiraki in 1913. It is found in Taiwan.

References

formosana
Moths described in 1913